Press to Meco is the first EP by English alternative rock band, Press to Meco. Recorded in mid-2011 by Monuments drummer Mike Malyan, completion of the extended play endured lengthy delays before being released on 9 July 2012. A music video for opening track, “Burning the Reward” was produced and released to coincide with the EP's eventual release.

Track listing

Personnel
Press to Meco
 Luke Caley – guitar, vocals
 Adam Roffey – bass, vocals
 Lewis Williams – drums, vocals

Additional personnel
 Mike Malyan – producer, didgeridoo, piano, strings
 Paul Antonio Ortiz – mixing, mastering 
 Andreu Mariner Piqueres – artwork

References 

2012 debut EPs
Press to Meco albums